Autherine Juanita Lucy (October 5, 1929 – March 2, 2022) was an American activist who was the first African-American student to attend the University of Alabama, in 1956. Her expulsion from the institution later that year led to the university's President Oliver Carmichael's resignation. Years later, the University admitted her as a master's student and in 2010 a clock tower was erected in her honor on its campus.

Early life
Lucy was born in Shiloh, Alabama. Her father Milton Cornelius Lucy and mother Minnie Maud Hosea were sharecroppers; she was the youngest child in a family of five sons and four daughters. The family owned and farmed 110 acres, and Lucy's father also did blacksmithing, and made baskets and ax handles to supplement their income. After attending public school in Shiloh through grade ten, she attended Linden Academy in Linden, Alabama. She graduated in 1947, and went on to attend Selma University in Selma for two years, after which she studied at the historically black Miles College in Fairfield. She graduated from Miles with a Bachelor of Arts in English in 1952.

Desegregation of the University of Alabama
In September 1952, she and a friend, Pollie Myers, a civil-rights activist with the NAACP, applied to the University of Alabama. Lucy later said that she wanted a second undergraduate degree, not for political reasons but to get the best possible education in the state. Although the women were accepted, their admittance was rescinded when the authorities discovered they were not white. Backed by the NAACP, Lucy and Myers charged the University with racial discrimination in a court case that took almost three years to resolve. While waiting, Lucy worked as an English teacher in Carthage, Mississippi, and as a secretary at an insurance company.

On June 29, 1955, the NAACP secured a court order preventing the University from rejecting the admission applications of Lucy and Myers (who had married and was then known as Pollie Myers Hudson) based upon their race. Lucy was finally admitted to the University but it rejected Hudson on the grounds that a child she had conceived before marriage made her an unsuitable student. Even though Lucy was officially admitted, she was still barred from all dormitories and dining halls. Days later, the court amended the order to apply to all other African-American students seeking admission. At least two sources have said that the board hoped that without Hudson, the more outgoing and assured of the pair and whose idea it originally was to enroll at Alabama, Lucy's own acceptance would mean little or nothing to her, and she would voluntarily decide not to attend. But Hudson and others strongly encouraged her, and on February 3, 1956, Lucy enrolled as a graduate student in library science, becoming the first African American ever admitted to a white public school or university in the state.

Lucy attended her first class on Friday, February 3, 1956. On Monday, February 6, 1956, riots broke out on the campus and a mob of more than a thousand men pelted the car in which the Dean of Women drove Lucy between classes. Threats were made against her life and the University president's home was stoned. The police were called to secure her attendance. These riots at the University were what was, to date, the most violent, post-Brown, anti-integration demonstration. After the riots, the University suspended Lucy from school because her own safety was a concern. 

Martin Luther King Jr. wrote a sermon in 1956 about the events and it at the Dexter Avenue Baptist Church the day before his trial for violating Alabama’s anti-boycott law:

Lucy was known and described as "the architect of desegregating Alabama's education systems." Thurgood Marshall helped win the 1954 landmark Supreme Court desegregation case, Brown v. Board of Education. The Brown decision said that racial segregation in public schools was unconstitutional (illegal). Marshall had a great amount of confidence that if the Supreme Court decided something, then the rest of the country would follow its decision. Attorneys for Lucy and the NAACP, including Arthur Shores and Marshall, helped build a lawsuit against the University because they believed the school helped the white mob by not having protection for her and prevented Lucy from attending class. A series of legal proceedings lasted from 1953 until 1955.

While Lucy felt defeated from being expelled and losing the court case, Marshall, who would become the first African-American Supreme Court Justice in 1967, thought differently. In a letter to Lucy, he said, "Whatever happens in the future, remember for all concerned, that your contribution has been made toward equal justice for all Americans and that you have done everything in your power to bring this about."

Lucy and the NAACP filed contempt-of-court charges against the trustees and president of the University; against the dean of women for barring her from the dining hall and dormitories, and against four other men (none connected to the University) for participating in the riots. On February 29, the Federal Court in Birmingham ordered that Lucy be reinstated and that the University must take adequate measures to protect her. The University trustees then expelled her permanently on a hastily contrived technicality. The University used the court case as a justification for her permanent expulsion, claiming that Lucy had slandered the University and they could not have her as a student. The NAACP, feeling that further legal action was pointless, did not contest this decision. Lucy acquiesced.

University President Oliver Carmichael resigned as a result of the trustees' opposition to Lucy's admission.

In April 1956, in Dallas, Lucy married Hugh Foster, a divinity student (and later a minister) whom she had met at Miles College. For some months afterward she was a civil rights advocate, making speeches at NAACP meetings around the country. But by the end of the year, her active involvement in the Civil Rights Movement had ceased.

Later life and death
After Lucy was expelled from the university, Marshall was so concerned about her safety that he brought her to New York to stay in his home with him and his wife, Cecilia. Lucy said later, "I just felt so secure with Mr. Marshall and his wife... How grateful I have been over all these years for the protection and the kindness he gave to me."

For the next seventeen years, Lucy and her family lived in various cities in Louisiana, Mississippi, and Texas. Her notoriety made it difficult at first for her to find employment as a teacher. The Fosters moved back to Alabama in 1974, and Lucy obtained a position in the Birmingham school system.

In April 1988, Lucy's expulsion was officially annulled by the University of Alabama. She enrolled in the graduate program in Education the following year and received an M.A. degree in May 1992. The University named an endowed fellowship in her honor and unveiled a portrait of her in the student union. The inscription reads "Her initiative and courage won the right for students of all races to attend the University. She is a sister of the Zeta Phi Beta sorority."

Lucy died on March 2, 2022, at the age of 92. Her grandniece, Nikema Williams, is a member of the United States House of Representatives and chair of the Democratic Party of Georgia.

Legacy

On November 3, 2010, the Autherine Lucy Clock Tower was dedicated in a new space honoring her, Vivian Malone, and James Hood (the Malone-Hood Plaza)—three individuals who pioneered desegregation at the University of Alabama. The Plaza is located beside Foster Auditorium, where, in 1963, Alabama Governor George Wallace unsuccessfully attempted to bar Malone and Hood from registering at the University. The  brick tower has a base displaying bronze plaques that chronicle the individual struggles of Lucy, Malone, and Hood. Additionally, on September 15, 2017, a special marker was erected in her honor near Graves Hall (home of the College of Education) on the UA campus. Lucy returned to speak at the ceremony and compared the crowd that welcomed her with the hatred she had encountered the first time she entered the university.

In May 2019, Lucy attended the University of Alabama's spring graduation, where the school presented her with an honorary doctorate.

Lucy's legacy continues at the University of Alabama with a $25,000 scholarship named after her and a picture of Lucy was put up at the university in 1992. On February 3, 2022, the university added Lucy's name to what was formerly Bibb Graves Hall, then changed to Lucy-Graves Hall. Following an outcry from students, faculty and the public about Lucy's name being placed alongside that of a former klansman, UA trustees dropped Graves's name completely from the hall on February 11, 2022, renaming the building Autherine Lucy Hall.

See also
List of African-American pioneers in desegregation of higher education
Timeline of the civil rights movement

References

External links

Martin Luther King Papers Project
Supreme Court decision concerning Univ. of Alabama student Autherine Lucy
The Crimson-white (University of Alabama student newspaper), Feb. 7, 1956, via W. S. Hoole Special Collections Library

1929 births
2022 deaths
Activists for African-American civil rights
Activists from Selma, Alabama
Miles College alumni
People from Marengo County, Alabama
School desegregation pioneers
University of Alabama alumni